A list of films produced in Italy in 1961 (see 1961 in film):

Notes

References

External links
Italian films of 1961 at the Internet Movie Database

1961
Films
Lists of 1961 films by country or language